Pirriya (also Birria, Bidia, Kunggari, Kulumali, and Kungadutji) is an extinct and unclassified Australian Aboriginal language. It was spoken by the Bidia people (also known as Biria) of the western and central western Queensland, including Barcoo Shire, Whitula Creek, Cooper Creek, and Jundah.

It is not to be confused with the Biri language and its dialects, also a Queensland language, spoken by the Biria people.

Classification 
Geographically it lay between the Karnic and Maric languages, but had no obvious connection to either; the data is too poor to draw any conclusions on classification. Dixon (2002) classes Pirriya with Kungkari as a subgroup of the Maric languages while Breen (1990) suggests it may be a Karnic language.

Vocabulary 
Some words from the Birria language, as spelt and written by Birria authors include:

 Billar: spear
 Binoor: bandicoot
 Boorong: rock
 Bowra: kangaroo
 Burlo moori: good day
 Gulburri: emu
 Noka: water
 Ullatah: moon

References

External links 
 Bibliography of Pirriya people and language resources, at the Australian Institute of Aboriginal and Torres Strait Islander Studies

Unclassified languages of Australia
Karnic languages
Extinct languages of Queensland